Tule is a plant (Schoenoplectus acutus) of the sedge family.

Geography
Tule may also refer to the following places in the United States:

Arizona:
Tule Desert or Tule Basin, in Coconino County
Tule Mountains, in Yuma County

California:
Los Tules, a populated place in San Diego County
Tule Creek, California, a stream that roughly parallels the first few miles of California State Route 371
Tule Valley, California, in Riverside County (originally Round Valley)
Tule Lake Basin, in Modoc County, near the 42nd parallel north
Tule Lake National Wildlife Refuge, an open water/croplands preserve of the United States Fish and Wildlife Service
Tule Lake War Relocation Center, a Japanese American internment camp of World War II
Tulelake, California, a city in Siskiyou County and namesake of the Tulelake Basin Joint Unified School District & Tulelake Municipal Airport
Tule River, in Tulare County, which was named for the Spanish tulare, the place of tules.
Tule River Indian Tribe of the Tule River Reservation

Colorado:
Tule Lakes, twin reservoirs separated by the Upper Tule Lake Dam in Arapahoe County

Montana:
Tule Valley (Montana), the course of Tule Creek in Roosevelt County

Nevada:
Tule Desert (Nevada), in Lincoln County
Tule Springs, a series of lakes in the Mojave Desert
Tule Springs Archaeological Site, a National Register of Historic Places listing in Clark County, Nevada
Tule Springs Ice Age Park, fossil beds which the Protectors of Tule Springs Wash lobby to be a national monument
Tule Springs Ranch, a National Register of Historic Places listings in Nevada partly in the archaeological site
Tule Springs Hills, a mountain range in Lincoln County
Tule Valley (Nevada), on Pine Creek, Elko County

New Mexico:
Little Tule Lake, in Curry County

Oregon:
Tule Lake Valley, in Klamath County

Texas:
Tule Canyon, a scenic area near Texas State Highway 207.
Tule Formation, the paleontological location of an extinct horse species (Equus francisci)
Tule Creek, a river with the Mckenzie Dam/Reservoir, which is in Briscoe County
Tule Lake Turning Basin, in Nueces County
Tule Pens, a road intersection in Briscoe County

Utah:
Tule Valley, Utah, an area of several valleys in the Great Salt Lake subregion
Tule Valley (basin), in Millard County and the area of a desiccated paleolake

Washington:
Tule Lake (Washington), in Whitman County

Other uses
 Tule fog, a weather phenomenon of California's Central Valley
 Guna people, an indigenous people of Panama and Colombia, sometimes formerly called "Tule Indians"